The larger brachycera is a name which refers to flies in the following families of the suborder Brachycera: 

 Acroceridae – hunch-back flies
 Asilidae – robber flies
 Athericidae – water snipe flies
 Bombyliidae – bee flies
 Rhagionidae – snipe flies
 Scenopinidae – window flies
 Stratiomyidae – soldier flies
 Tabanidae – horse flies
 Therevidae – stiletto flies
 Xylomyidae – wood soldier flies
 Xylophagidae – awl-flies

References

Brachycera